Richard Holiman (fl. 1386–1388) was an English politician.

He was a Member (MP) of the Parliament of England for Wycombe in 1386 and February 1388. No further information on him has been found.

References

Year of birth missing
Year of death missing
English MPs 1386
English MPs February 1388